Newfield is a suburb in the New Zealand city of Invercargill.

The sign at the Māori secondary school Te Wharekura O Arowhenua in Newfield was defaced with racist graffiti in December 2020. Police launched an investigation, and increased patrols in the Newfield area to reassure the community.

Demographics

Newfield had a population of 2,787 at the 2018 New Zealand census, an increase of 33 people (1.2%) since the 2013 census, and an increase of 30 people (1.1%) since the 2006 census. There were 1,092 households. There were 1,347 males and 1,440 females, giving a sex ratio of 0.94 males per female. The median age was 39.1 years (compared with 37.4 years nationally), with 561 people (20.1%) aged under 15 years, 513 (18.4%) aged 15 to 29, 1,170 (42.0%) aged 30 to 64, and 543 (19.5%) aged 65 or older.

Ethnicities were 87.6% European/Pākehā, 18.6% Māori, 4.6% Pacific peoples, 3.7% Asian, and 1.8% other ethnicities (totals add to more than 100% since people could identify with multiple ethnicities).

The proportion of people born overseas was 8.9%, compared with 27.1% nationally.

Although some people objected to giving their religion, 52.1% had no religion, 37.0% were Christian, 0.4% were Hindu, 0.8% were Muslim, 0.2% were Buddhist and 2.6% had other religions.

Of those at least 15 years old, 204 (9.2%) people had a bachelor or higher degree, and 651 (29.2%) people had no formal qualifications. The median income was $28,100, compared with $31,800 nationally. 201 people (9.0%) earned over $70,000 compared to 17.2% nationally. The employment status of those at least 15 was that 1,083 (48.7%) people were employed full-time, 300 (13.5%) were part-time, and 63 (2.8%) were unemployed.

Education
Newfield Park School is a contributing primary school for years 1 to 6 with a roll of  students as of  

Te Wharekura o Arowhenua is a composite school for years 1 to 13 with a roll of  students. It is a Kura Kaupapa Māori which teaches in the Māori language. The school opened in 1992 as Te Kura Kaupapa Māori o Arowhenua, a primary school. In 1999, it moved to its current site (formerly that of Cargill High School), changed its name, and expanded to include secondary students.

References

Suburbs of Invercargill